FC Ufa-2 is a Russian football team from Ufa. It is the farm-club for FC Ufa.

History
The club participated in the amateur competitions since its establishment in 2011, including Russian Amateur Football League. For the 2018–19 season, it was licensed for the third-tier Russian Professional Football League. It left PFL after the 2019–20 season.

References

Association football clubs established in 2011
FC Ufa
2011 establishments in Russia